Dunvegan West Wildland Provincial Park is a wildland provincial park in Saddle Hills County, Alberta, Canada. The park consists of several separated parcels of land along the south bank of the Peace River from Dunvegan west to the British Columbia border.

Ecology
The park protects part of the Peace River parkland ecological subregion which is the smallest subregion in Alberta, accounting for only 0.5 percent of the area of the province. The park also contains the dry mixedwood subregion of the Boreal Forest.

The river and creek valley cliffs are home to nesting bald eagles, golden eagles, and falcons. The valleys provide year-round habitat for deer and elk.

Activities
The park is not developed with camping facilities so only backcountry camping and hiking is permitted. Hunting and fishing are allowed with proper permits. Canoeing and kayaking on the creeks running into the Peace River are permitted.

See also
Peace River Country
List of Alberta provincial parks
List of Canadian provincial parks

References

Parks in Alberta